Anne or Ann Lyons may refer to:

Anne Theresa Bickerton Lyons (1815–1894), Baroness von Würtzburg
Fay-Ann Lyons (born 1980), Trinidadian songwriter
Ann Lyons (judge) (born 1953), justice of the Supreme Court of Queensland

See also
Anne Murray, later Lady Glamis, married name Anne Lyon
Jo Anne Lyon (born 1940), one of the General Superintendents of the Wesleyan Church
Lyons (surname)